Cameron Saul (born 28 June 1995) is an English professional footballer who plays as a forward for  Zakynthos

Career

Youth 
Saul started his career with Luton Town academy aged 12 having impressed playing with his school team. After failing to make the breakthrough in to the first team, he moved on to non-league side Wingate & Finchley. After two years with the club, Saul left to take a scholarship opportunity in America. Saul attended three universities in the United States, and graduated in 2018. Upon graduation, he signed for Greenville Triumph of the USL in 2019.

Professional

Greenville Triumph 
Saul played 18 games and scored 4 goals as Greenville Triumph finished in 3rd place in the regular season, before going on to lose the final of the play-offs to North Texas in October 2019.

Finn Harps 

Saul signed for Finn Harps in the League of Ireland Premier Division for the 2020 season on the 19 February 2020. Saul made his debut against Cork City. On March 14, 2020, the league was suspended due to the Covid-19 outbreak. Following a return to pre season in July, Saul sustained and injury causing him to miss the remainder of the shortened season.

APS Zakynthos 
In March 2021, Saul joined Gamma Ethniki side Zakynthos until the end of the season.  Zakynthos finished first in Gamma Ethniki, gaining promotion to Super League Greece 2.

Career statistics

References

External links
 
 
 Profile at Lenoir-Rhyne Athletics

1995 births
Living people
Young Harris Mountain Lions men's soccer players
Greenville Triumph SC players
USL League One players
English footballers
English expatriate footballers
Association football midfielders
National Premier Soccer League players
Lenoir–Rhyne Bears
Footballers from Greater London
English expatriate sportspeople in the United States
Expatriate association footballers in the Republic of Ireland
League of Ireland players
Finn Harps F.C. players
Association football forwards
Expatriate footballers in Greece
English expatriate sportspeople in Greece
Gamma Ethniki players
A.P.S. Zakynthos players
Black British sportspeople